Year 212 (CCXII) was a leap year starting on Wednesday (link will display the full calendar) of the Julian calendar. At the time, it was known as the Year of the Consulship of Asper and Camilius (or, less frequently, year 965 Ab urbe condita). The denomination 212 for this year has been used since the early medieval period, when the Anno Domini calendar era became the prevalent method in Europe for naming years.

Events 
 By place 

 Roman Empire 
 The edict of Emperor Caracalla (Constitutio Antoniniana) extends Roman citizenship to all free inhabitants of the Roman Empire, with the exception of a limited group that may include Egyptians. The Jewish people are among those who receive citizenship. All free women in the Empire are given the same rights as Roman women.
 Roman jurist Papinian, one of the famous jurists who flourished during the reign of the late emperor Septimius Severus, refuses to write a legal defence for the murder of Caracalla's brother, Publius Septimius Geta. He is beheaded in Rome, in Caracalla's presence.
 Caracalla quiets the objections of the Roman army to Geta's murder, by huge donations.
 Construction begins on the Baths of Caracalla in Rome.
 Edessa in Mesopotamia becomes a Roman province.

Deaths 
 Annia Cornificia Faustina Minor, daughter of Marcus Aurelius (b. 160)
 Gao You, Chinese scholar, historian, politician and writer (b 168)
 Ma Teng (or Shoucheng), Chinese general and warlord 
 Papinian, Roman jurist and praetorian prefect (b. 142)
 Serenus Sammonicus, Roman poet and physician
 Xun Yu, Chinese politician and adviser (b. 163)
 Zhang Hong, Chinese official and politician (b. 153)

References